Jalan Arang National Secondary School is a public secondary school situated on Jalan Arang in Kuching, the capital of the East Malaysian state of Sarawak. The school was founded in January 2003. It offers classes from Transition up to Form 5.

Built on a  site, the school has 38 classrooms, a staffroom, administrative offices, a canteen, library, science labs, computer labs, basketball courts, a futsal court, a greenhouse, a football field and an assembly hall.

History
Jalan Arang National Secondary School had its beginnings in 2003, pioneered by Mdm. Belinda Lim Sok Khoon as the Acting Principal and Mdm. Hii Kwong Ing as the Senior Assistant of Student Affairs along with 878 students, 43 academic staff and 7 non-academic staff. During that time, 22 classes were assigned (from transition class until Form 4). Due to the small number of students, there were only a morning session for the class schedule.

In 2004, an afternoon session was added, thus making the school a two-session school (morning and afternoon) to accommodate the expansion into 31 classes for 1221 students, 59 academic staff and 11 non-academic staff. The year 2004 also marks the arrival of Mdm. Mary John as the principal of Jalan Arang National Secondary School. Mr. Daniel Anyie Eng was appointed the Afternoon Session Supervisor while Mr. William Tedong as the Senior Assistant in Co-Curricular Activities.

In July 2005, Mr. Haris Fadzillah Hj. Bahar was transferred over from Matang Jaya National Secondary School as Senior Assistant in Administration, replacing Mdm. Belinda Lim, who had left the school a month earlier for St. Joseph's Secondary School, Kuching.

In July 2006, Mdm. Mary John, then principal of Jalan Arang National Secondary School, was transferred to SMK St. Teresa. Then in October, Mdm. Fong Yut Kuen arrived and was appointed the principal of Jalan Arang National Secondary School until today.

In 2007, construction commenced on a school hall over the school's futsal court and was completed in the same year.

In 2009, Mdm. Hii Kwong Ing as the Senior Assistant of Student Affairs of Jalan Arang National Secondary School, was transferred and replaced by Mdm. Hajar Asma. Mr. William Tedong before this was the Senior Assistant in Co-Curricular Activities then became the Afternoon Session Supervisor. His place was replaced by Mr. Mohammad Jasni as the Senior Assistant in Co-Curricular Activities. Several projects were completed; new assembly ground, several walkways and the school was repainted.

In 2015, Mr. Tan Chiok Peng became the school's new Senior Assistant in Administration, replacing Mr. Haris Fadzillah Hj. Bahar, who had been retired since 2014.

Principals

School anthem
Ku Ukir Namamu is the name of the school's anthem. It was written by Latip Polly and arranged by Mr. James Eddie Emai. 

Lyrics

Terukir nama sekolahku, SMK Jalan Arang,Menabur jasa untuk negara, 

jadi kebanggaan semua.

Inilah visi sekolahku,

sekolah unggul berwibawa,

Hasilkan generasi maju berjaya,

berakhlak mulia sentiasa.

Kau dengarlah pesanan guru,

Perjalananmu ada arahnya.

Kau jadilah pelajar berjaya,

Harum nama nergara.

Kau sayangilah sekolahmu,

Sematkan teguh di jiwa.

Jadilah generasi berpekerti,

Negara menyanjungimu.

Sport houses 
There are currently four sport houses. The sport houses are named after types of big cats: Leopard, Puma, Cheetah, and Jaguar. Students represent their sport houses in the school's annual Sports Day. Sports Day is usually held around April where students from the four sport houses will compete against each other in various sporting activities such as running, shot put, javelin throwing, long jump, high jump, and more.

Classes
The school currently has two transition classes, eleven Form 1 and ten Form 2 classes, nine Form 3, Form 4, and Form 5 classes, making it a total of 49 classes. However the school can add or subtract more classes if needed, such is the case of the batch of 2021 where the school added another Form 1 class. Form 4 and Form 5 classes are split into two streams, science and arts. Since the school has double sessions, the time of day allocated to certain classes is split. Afternoon classes are given to Transition, Form 1, and Form 2 students while morning classes are given to Form 3, Form 4, and Form 5 students.

Classes from Transition up to Form 3 are named after cities of varying countries such as Amsterdam, Frankfurt, Indianapolis to name a few. Unlike them however, classes from Form 4 and Form 5 have two different naming schemes for each stream. Science stream classes are typically named after the structure of an atom whereas art stream classes are named after different minerals.

School magazine
The first school magazine was published in 2004 and has continued to be published in a yearly format. The magazine contains yearly achievements set by students in their examinations or cocurricular activities, various photos of school activities that have happened in the past year, essays written by the students in different languages, and photos of school clubs, classes, teachers, and students alike. In the year 2020 however, the school transitioned to a digital yearbook in the form of a video showcasing the pages of the yearbook.

Achievements 
 In December 2019, SMK Jalan Arang students Joel Kwoh Lik Xun and Hii Tuong Jing won the City Guardian category in the MakeX Starter Competition held in Guangzhou, China. They completed their mission with a full score in the fastest time of 2 minutes and 54 seconds. They were awarded ¥20,000 (or $3,100 USD) as the Champion prize and were also featured in the news.

Photos

References

National secondary schools in Malaysia
Secondary schools in Sarawak
2003 establishments in Malaysia
Secondary schools in Malaysia